"The Hardest Thing" is the third single released from American boy band 98 Degrees's second studio album, 98 Degrees and Rising (1998). "The Hardest Thing" peaked at number five in the United States, number 10 in Canada, number 29 in the United Kingdom, and number 31 in Ireland. It also experienced moderate success in Oceania, peaking at number 24 in Australia and number five in New Zealand. The single was certified gold by the Recording Industry Association of America (RIAA) for sales of 500,000 units.

Song meaning
The song is about a man who is torn between two women that he loves: one being his significant other and the other being his mistress. This is apparent when Doctor Zhivago is referenced in the second verse of the song. In the end, the man chooses to say goodbye to his mistress because it is only fair to his significant other, who has always trusted him. This becomes clear in the first verse of the song when he says, "I've got somewhere else to be, promises to keep / Someone else who loves me and trusts me fast asleep." However, as he is saying goodbye to the mistress, he has to hide his true feelings (love) from her; hence, the title of the song: "The Hardest Thing". As he says goodbye to his mistress, he thinks, "It's the hardest thing I'll ever have to do to look you in the eye and tell you I don't love you." However, he knows that their love is real and that they will (hopefully) meet again when the time is right: "I know that we'll meet again/Fate has a place and time / So you can get on with your life."

Music video
The music video takes place inside a boxing arena. Nick Lachey, the protagonist in the video, is the gentleman who is torn between two ladies. Nick is a boxer in the video, and his mistress is a show girl. His significant other is not in the video.

Track listings

US and Australasian CD single
 "The Hardest Thing" (radio edit)
 "Because of You" (Hex Hector dance mix)
 "Invisible Man" (album version)

US cassette single
A1. "The Hardest Thing" (edit)
A2. "Because of You" (Hex Hecto dance mix)
B1. "The Hardest Thing" (album version)
B2. "Invisible Man" (album version)

European CD single
 "The Hardest Thing" (radio edit) – 3:45
 "The Hardest Thing" (Love to Infinity radio mix) – 3:45

European maxi-CD single
 "The Hardest Thing" (radio edit) – 3:45
 "The Hardest Thing" (Love to Infinity radio mix) – 3:45
 "The Hardest Thing" (Love to Infinity Master mix) – 6:35
 "The Hardest Thing" (Murlyn remix) – 3:47

UK CD single
 "The Hardest Thing" (radio edit) – 3:45
 "The Hardest Thing" (album version) – 4:34
 "The Hardest Thing" (Love to Infinity Master mix) – 3:46
 "The Hardest Thing" (video)

Charts

Weekly charts

Year-end charts

Certifications

Release history

References

1990s ballads
1998 songs
1999 singles
98 Degrees songs
Songs about infidelity
Songs written by David Frank (musician)
Songs written by Steve Kipner
Universal Records singles